Zito is a last name of Italian origin. It comes from the word "Zitu", meaning "young bachelor".

People with the name
Antonio Zito (born 1986), Italian footballer
Barry Zito (born 1978), American baseball pitcher
Bill Zito (born 1964), American attorney and sports agent
Carmelo Zito (1899–1980), Italian-American anti-fascist
Chuck Zito (born 1953), American stuntman and actor
Dominic Zito (born 1982), American choreographer
Frank Zito (1893–1974), Sicilian-American Mafia member
Johnny Zito (born 1982), American filmmaker
Jonathan Zito, (1965-1992), manslaughter victim
Joseph Zito (born 1946), American film director
Mike Zito (born 1970), American singer-songwriter
Mzwanele Zito (born 1988), South African rugby union player
Richie Zito (born 1952), American songwriter
Torrie Zito (1933–2009), American pianist and musical arranger-conductor
Nick Zito (born 1948), American horse trainer

Fictional characters
Detective Lawrence "Larry" Zito,  a character from Miami Vice

See also
Zito (disambiguation)

References

Italian-language surnames